Bugalhos is a civil parish in the municipality of Alcanena, Portugal. The population in 2011 was 1,084.

References

Freguesias of Alcanena